Aegilops crassa is an ornamental plant in the family Poaceae. It is referred to by the common name Persian goatgrass. It is native to Afghanistan, Iran, Iraq, Kazakhstan, Kyrgyzstan, Lebanon, Palestine, Syria, Tajikistan, Transcaucasia, Turkey, Turkmenistan, and Uzbekistan.

References

External links
GrainGenes Species Report: Aegilops crassa 
USDA Plants Profile: Aegilops crassa

crassa
Flora of Western Asia
Taxa named by Rudolph Friedrich Hohenacker
Taxa named by Pierre Edmond Boissier
Flora of Afghanistan
Flora of Iran
Flora of Iraq
Flora of Kazakhstan
Flora of Kyrgyzstan
Flora of Lebanon
Flora of Palestine (region)
Flora of Syria
Flora of Tajikistan
Flora of the Transcaucasus
Flora of Turkmenistan
Flora of Uzbekistan